Volodarka is an urban-type settlement located on the Ros River in Bila Tserkva Raion, Kyiv Oblast (region) of Ukraine. It hosts the administration of Volodarka settlement hromada, one of the hromadas of Ukraine.  Population: . In 2001, population was 7,639.

Battle of Wołodarka took place nearby in May, 1920.

Until 18 July 2020, Volodarka was the administrative center of Volodarka Raion. The raion was abolished that day as part of the administrative reform of Ukraine, which reduced the number of raions of Kyiv Oblast to seven. The area of Volodarka Raion was merged into Bila Tserkva Raion.

References

Urban-type settlements in Bila Tserkva Raion